Cyril "Sonny" Moorman (born 1955) is an American power blues guitarist. His style is sometimes compared to that of the Duane Allman, Jimi Hendrix, Eric Clapton, Lonnie Mack, Gov't Mule, and occasionally Warren Haynes.  Moorman's parents owned a nightclub called the "Half-Way Inn" located halfway between Hamilton, Ohio and Middletown, Ohio on Ohio State Route 4 where he was able to watch musicians who played there, such as Lonnie Mack, from an early age. Moorman attended Michigan State University and also graduated from the Musicians Institute in Hollywood. He also owned a music lesson studio in Fairfield, Ohio called Rock School, and now offers guitar lessons out of 3rd Street Music in Hamilton, Ohio. He has been a member of Warren Zevon's touring band and the Tomcats with members of Sly and the Family Stone. One of his signature tunes is his cover of Lonnie Mack's Cincinnati Jail. Moorman sometimes plays a Jamonn Zeiler crafted Acoustic guitar and a 2004 model Gibson Flying V Reissue. On some tunes Sonny plays Slide guitar either upright or laptop.  The band has opened for Johnny Winter in 2012.

Band members

Former members
Greg Day, drums and vocals
Danny Paul, bass guitar and vocals
Jeff Wilson, drums and vocals
Red MacCormack, drums
Elmer Monk, drums
Gus Delao, drums
Brian Sergi, drums
Jimmy McNeely, drums
Joe Clooney, drums and vocals
Jamie Combs, drums and vocals
"Bad Bob" Logsdon, bass guitar and vocals
Denny Hymer, bass guitar and vocals
Willy D – bass guitar and Vocals
Nick Giese – bass guitar
Jared Manker – bass guitar
Mike Willis – bass guitar and vocals
Raiford Faircloth- bass, guitar, and vocals
Mark Hoffman – Bass Guitar
Chris Perreault -- bass
Dave Fair -- drums
Mike Tetrault - Harmonica
Mark Dudderar, drums and percussion and vocals
Martin Horst – bass guitar
Joe Cowels, guitar, vocals

Current members
Moorman currently does solo acoustic performances and he also makes several appearances a week with his band, the Sonny Moorman Group. They are:
Sonny Moorman, guitar and vocals
Dave Kammerer, drums
Martin Romie, bass guitar

Discography
Telegraph Road
Sonny's Blues
Crossroads Motel
Sonny Moorman:Live at the Cincy Blues Fest
Live as Hell
More Live as Hell
Lucky 13

References

External links
The former Sonny Moorman official website (domain redirects to new website ~ below)
The Sonny Moorman official website
Jamon Zeiler Fine Crafted Guitars

Living people
1955 births
American blues guitarists
American male guitarists
Musicians from Cincinnati
Musicians Institute alumni
Guitarists from Ohio
20th-century American guitarists
20th-century American male musicians